California Republic, or Bear Flag Republic, was the period of revolt against Mexico initially proclaimed by a handful of American settlers in Mexican California on June 14, 1846.

California Republic may also refer to:
The modern State of California in the United States.
California Republic (mixtape), 2012 mixtape by Game
New California Republic, a fictional government from the Fallout series